Portraits of Courage: A Commander in Chief's Tribute to America's Warriors is a book published in 2017 that includes a collection of oil paintings and stories about military veterans by former U.S. President George W. Bush.

History
Bush's painting started as a post-presidency pastime. He created a set of paintings in the evenings as a way to commemorate some of the veterans he has met since leaving office in 2009. This book is his first art book.

The foreword was written by former First Lady Laura Bush and by General Peter Pace, 16th Chairman of the U.S. Joint Chiefs of Staff. It contains sixty-six full-color portraits and a four-panel mural based on photographs of ninety-eight physically and/or mentally wounded U.S. Armed Forces veterans (Army, Marine Corps, Navy, Air Force) of the Afghanistan and Iraq wars as painted by President Bush. Bush wrote the descriptive prose that accompanies each painting. Bush donated his share of the proceeds from the book to the non-profit George W. Bush Presidential Center.

The book is available as a hardcover and in a limited edition signed by Bush, a deluxe oversized cloth-bound book with a specially designed slipcover. An audio CD read by President Bush was also released. The oil paintings portraying Sergeant First Class Ramon Padilla, Sergeant Daniel Casara, Lance Corporal Timothy John Lang, Sergeant First Class Michael R. Rodriguez, Sergeant Leslie Zimmerman,  Sergeant Michael Joseph Leonard Politowicz and Lieutenant Colonel Kent Graham Solheim appear on the cover of the book (left to right, top to bottom).

An exhibition of the portraits ran from March 2 to October 17, 2017 at the George W. Bush Presidential Library and Museum.

Reception

A review by Jonathan Alter in The New York Times called Bush as "an evocative and surprisingly adept artist who has dramatically improved his technique while also doing penance for one of the greatest disasters in American history."

See also
 Out of Many, One: Portraits of America's Immigrants, 2021 book by Bush

References

Further reading
 Time magazine: George W. Bush Discusses His New Book of Oil Paintings (interviewed by Michael Duffy, March 2, 2017)

External links
George W. Bush Books website

2017 non-fiction books
American non-fiction books
Books about military personnel
Books about visual art
Books by George W. Bush
Works about American military personnel
Works about painting
English-language books
Crown Publishing Group books
Books written by presidents of the United States